Elizabeth Jean (Betty) O'Neil is an American computer scientist known for her highly cited work in databases, including C-Store, the LRU-K page replacement algorithm, the log-structured merge-tree, and her criticism of the ANSI SQL 92 isolation mechanism. She is a professor of computer science at the University of Massachusetts Boston.

Education and career
O'Neil is a 1963 graduate of the Massachusetts Institute of Technology, majoring in applied mathematics. She completed a Ph.D. in applied mathematics at Harvard University in 1968. Her dissertation was A quasi-linear theory for axially symmetric flows in a stratified rotating fluid. After postdoctoral research at the Courant Institute of Mathematical Sciences of New York University, and short-term teaching positions at New York University and the Massachusetts Institute of Technology, she joined the faculty of the University of Massachusetts Boston in 1970.

Book
O'Neil is the author, with Patrick O'Neil, of the book Database: Principles, Programming, Performance (Morgan Kaufmann, 2nd ed., 2001).

References

External links
Home page

Year of birth missing (living people)
Living people
American computer scientists
American women computer scientists
University of Massachusetts Boston faculty
Database researchers
Massachusetts Institute of Technology School of Science alumni
Harvard University alumni
American women academics
21st-century American women